Come On Danger! is a 1932 Pre-Code Western film, and the first film Tom Keene would make at RKO Studios. It made a profit of $30,000.

It was remade in 1942 under the similar title, Come on Danger.

Plot
Jim Madden, a Texas Ranger, is gunned down while investigating the murder of a local rancher. His younger brother, Larry, vows to track down the suspected killer, another rancher named Joan Stanton. While looking into the murders, he stumbles on a battle between Stanton, and a group of men working for another rancher, Frank Sanderson. Rescuing Stanton from the altercation, he keeps his identity as a Ranger secret, while attempting to learn the truth of what is going on. Through talks with Stanton, Madden learns that Sanderson has been setting her up for both the murder of the other rancher, and Jim's death.

Convinced by Stanton's story, Madden tells Stanton she must turn herself in, and she agrees. Before they can reach the Rangers, they are captured by Sanderson's men. Sanderson plans to kill Madden, and take Stanton to Mexico. With the help of Rangers' cook, Rusty, as well as several of Stanton's men, Madden overcomes Sanderson and his men, and takes a vindicated Stanton back to the Rangers.

Cast
(cast list as per AFI database)
 Tom Keene as Larry Madden
 Julie Haydon as Joan Stanton
 Rosco Ates as Rusty
 Robert Ellis as Frank Sanderson
 William Scott as Jim Madden
 Frank Lackteen as Piute
 Wade Boteler as Tex
 Roy Stewart as Inspector Clay
 Harry Tenbrook as Bill

References

External links
Come on Danger! at IMDb

1930 Western (genre) films
American Western (genre) films
1930 films
1930s American films